Matteo Zaccolini (April 1574 – 13 July 1630) was an Italian painter, priest and author of the late Mannerist and early Baroque periods.  He was a mathematical theorist on perspective. He is also called "Zacolini" and "Zocolino".

Works
Born in Cesena, he was a pupil of the local painter Francesco Masini, and became a Theatine priest.  He was a protégé of Cardinal Vincenzo Giustiniani, who was renowned for his patronage of painters, including Caravaggio, Nicolas Poussin and Domenichino.

Zaccolini collaborated with Baldassare Croce with the quadratura frescoes in the church of Santa Susanna, where he painted the trompe-l'œil columns. In collaboration with Giuseppe Agellio and Cristoforo Roncalli, he painted in San Silvestro al Quirinale. He joined the Theatine order in 1603. From then on, he worked solely in Theatine projects, in Naples and Rome.

He is best known for a four volume treatise, written 1618–1622, on the theory of painting with titles: De Colori, Prospettiva del Colore, Prospettiva lineale, and Della Descrittione dell'Ombre prodotte da corpi opachi rettilinei. These works, while not in general circulation, gained him renown among eclectic circles in Rome. In 1666, the historian and fellow Theatine Giuseppe Silos described Zaccolini as one of the "Geniuses of our order and most admirable men of his age". Bellori described him as a master of perspective and optics, and as having instructed Domenichino, Gagliardi, Circignani, and Cavaliere d’Arpino among others.

Zaccolini was a fervent admirer of Leonardo da Vinci. According to Zaccolini's early biographer Cassiano dal Pozzo, the earliest version of the manuscript was written in mirror-script which, like the manuscript's content, revealed the influence of the writings of Leonardo.

Notes

References
*
 Short biography
Cassiano dal Pozzo's Copy of the Zaccolini Manuscripts, by Janis C. Bell, Journal of the Warburg and Courtauld Institutes 1988) Volume 51; pages 103-125.
http://www.repubblica.it/repubblicarts/giustiniani/testo.html
Baglioni's Vite.

1574 births
1630 deaths
People from Cesena
16th-century Italian painters
Italian male painters
17th-century Italian painters
Italian art historians
Italian male non-fiction writers
Italian Baroque painters
Trompe-l'œil artists